"Born to Love You" is a song co-written and recorded by American country music artist Mark Collie.  It was released in January 1993 as the second single from the album Mark Collie.  The song reached number 6 on the Billboard Hot Country Singles & Tracks chart.  The song was written by Collie, Don Cook and Chick Rains.

Music video
The music video was directed by John Lloyd Miller and premiered in early 1993.

Chart performance
"Born to Love You" debuted at number 63 on the U.S. Billboard Hot Country Singles & Tracks for the week of January 30, 1993.

Year-end charts

References

1993 singles
1993 songs
Mark Collie songs
Songs written by Don Cook
Songs written by Mark Collie
Songs written by Chick Rains
Song recordings produced by Don Cook
Music videos directed by John Lloyd Miller
MCA Records singles